Jay Martin is the head soccer coach at Ohio Wesleyan University and is the career wins leader in college soccer.

Martin has won two NCAA Division III Men's Soccer Championships - one in 1998 and one in 2011.  He has also won more than two dozen conference titles.  En route to the 2011 title, he tied the record in the national semifinals and broke the record in winning the championship.

He has also served as athletic director and lacrosse coach at Ohio Wesleyan.

References

External links
 Ohio Wesleyan profile

Year of birth missing (living people)
Living people
American soccer coaches
Ohio Wesleyan Battling Bishops men's lacrosse coaches
Ohio Wesleyan Battling Bishops athletic directors
Ohio Wesleyan Battling Bishops men's soccer coaches